Rugged Maniac is an annual obstacle course race, otherwise known as a mud run, which is hosted in multiple cities across the United States and Canada. Participants run a 5 kilometer (3.1 mile) course with obstacles ranging from muddy water slides, crawling through tunnels, jumping over logs set on fire, and scaling large, curved walls. Billionaire entrepreneur Mark Cuban has invested in Rugged Maniac, after meeting them on season 5 of the hit ABC reality show Shark Tank.

History

Rugged Maniac was first established in June 2010 by founder and CEO, Brad Scudder, a former attorney. Rob Dickens, the co-founder and COO, was previously a corporate lawyer on Wall Street at Milbank, Tweed, Hadley & McCloy.

2010: Inaugural Rugged Maniac event in New England 
In October 2010, the very first Rugged Maniac event was held in Southwick, Massachusetts, where they hosted over 2,000 race participants. Scudder used his savings from the past two years as a lawyer to fund the event. The feature race had waves of 330 people every half hour and a festival with music, food and beer for the racers.

The event has since expanded to 30 event days in the United States and Canada. The largest event, held in the inaugural New England location Southwick, MA, boasted approximately 12,000 total race participants in the fall of 2015.

2013: Shark Tank appearance and investment from Mark Cuban 
Rugged Maniac (under company name Rugged Races LLC) experienced steady growth and in 2013, caught the attention of Shark Tank, a reality television series in which entrepreneurs pitch business ideas to a panel of investors. In September 2013, the producers of Shark Tank contacted Scudder and Dickens to compete in the show. The initial investment they asked for from the Sharks was $1 million for 10% of the company. Eventually they reached a deal with Mark Cuban and settled on a $1.75 million investment for 25% of the business.

On January 16, 2016, Rugged Maniac, appeared again on Shark Tank in an update video. Since first appearing on the show, the Rugged Maniac event has expanded to Canada, increased in sales from $4.2 million to $10.5 million before and after Shark Tank, expanded to 28 cities, and created a second race called "The Costume Dash 5K", which debuted in Boston in October 2015.

Rugged Races LLC has been consistently listed as one of the most successful Shark Tank investment deals in terms of growth and profit margin since airing on the show.

2016: Partnerships with Men's Health, American Cancer Society, and NASCAR 
In May 2016, American Cancer Society announced an official charity partnership with Rugged Maniac. As an extension of traditional walk or run for cancer events, American Cancer Society and Rugged Maniac have created a fundraising platform in which participants can raise funds exclusively for the society.

In June 2016, Rodale, Inc., the publisher of Men's Health and Women's Health (magazine) announced its partnership with Rugged Races LLC. Specifically, Men's Health magazine would be working to bring in advertising partners for Rugged Maniac, in the form of branded obstacles, such as the 12-foot-tall warped wall. Men's Health had a previous partnership with Urbanathlon, but cited their motivation to work with a "bigger and better" brand in running events for their new partnership with Rugged Maniac.

In July 2016, Rugged Maniac was the title sponsor for Joe Gibbs Racing in the NASCAR XFINITY series at Daytona International Speedway. David Ragan was the driver of the #18 Rugged Maniac Toyota Camry, in place of Matt Tifft, who had been scheduled for brain surgery.

2016: Hurricane Matthew hits North Carolina event 
In October 2016, Hurricane Matthew threatened to close down a Rugged Maniac event in North Carolina. Originally scheduled for October 8, 2016, race directors decided to move the event date from Saturday to Sunday instead of cancelling the event. In an official statement from the company to participants, they stated "This is Rugged Maniac, not a tea party at the retirement home."

Race event locations 
Rugged Races is hosting 30 races in the United States and Canada in 2017.

Race details

Qualifying and Placement 
Rugged Maniac is open to all participants aged 12 or older.

There are no qualifying standards to be met in order to be considered for placement. To be considered for the winning podium, runners must race in the "Elite Heat" wave of runners with timing chips. As of January 2017, the timing chip system has been removed and replaced with a manual record of the top 10 finishers in each category. 

Skipping an obstacle results in the disqualification from placing in the official results.

Obstacles 

Rugged Manic has 25 obstacles over a 5 km (3.1-mile) course. While the type of obstacles may vary from location to location, each course has 25 obstacles. This includes:
 Antigravity - Two rows of trampolines which bounce the participant up a padded cargo climbing wall.
 Frog Hop - Floating wooden/plastic platforms, "lilypads", held together by rope and spanning a muddy river.
 The Ringer - Rows of pull-up rings suspended over a large water pit.
 Accelerator - A steep, 50-foot water slide into a deep pool of water.
 The Gauntlet 2.0 - Massive swinging bags suspended over narrow paths made of foam pads. These paths slowly sink into the pool of water.
 The Warped Wall - A tall wall (2.6 meters tall) curving backwards at the top.
 Leap of Faith - A 4-foot deep pool of muddy water in which participants jump into and cross.
 Pyromaniac - Rows of burning logs. Participants must jump over these logs.
 Waterworks - Large floating pipes in waist-deep water in which participants must go under and over them.
 Balance or Bust - Thin wooden walkways over water.
 Tipping Point - A see-saw obstacle.
 Let's Cargo - Cargo nets leading up a steep incline.
 Pipe Dream - Large drainage pipes to crawl through, usually placed through mud tunnels.
 Commando Crawl - A crawl through muddy waters under barbed wire. Usually found near "Pipe Dream".
 Claustrophobia - Dark, narrow tunnels cut through the earth.
 Speed Trap - Muddy water with randomly placed, steep drop-offs.
 Napoleon Complex - 8-foot-tall wooden scaling walls.
 The Trenches - Wide mud trenches dug in the ground, participants must leap over them.
 Quad Burners - Tall dirt hills.
 Jacob's Ladder - 12-foot-tall wooden ladder pyramids.
 Head Scratcher - A low belly-crawl under barbed wire through a muddy, watery field.
 Ninja Escape - Triangular wooden platforms placed in a zig-zag formation above a muddy field.
 Beam Me Up - A slanted 14-foot ladder wall.
 Pack Mule - Participants may select a 25- or 50-pound sandbag to carry over a short distance.
 Shoe Catcher - Thick pool of mud that runners must run through.
 Barricades - Short, 4-foot walls that are designed for participants to vault over.
 Bang the Gong - Small trampolines placed in front of metal gongs suspended over a body of water. Participants must jump and hit the gong before falling into the water.
 The Gauntlet (Discontinued) - Massive swinging bags over a narrow wooden path suspended over a body of water.

Festival

Rugged Maniac hosts an all-day festival during the event, which features live music, food, beer, and exhibits by their sponsor companies. Runners can participate all day and visit booths for free food and products from sponsors.

There is an awards ceremony following each race, which features a medal presentation to people in the following categories:
 Top 3 male finishers
 Top 3 female finishers
 Top male aged 20 and below
 Top female aged 20 and below
 Top male aged 50 and above
 Top female aged 50 and above
Activities such as full-sized bounce houses and mechanical bull riding are also available for all participants.

Progression of Rugged Maniac finisher medals. (from left to right: 2017 to 2014)

Sponsors and Charity

Rugged Maniac has sponsor partnerships with some notable names: Harpoon Brewery, the presenting sponsor, which will be hosting 12 races in 2016, the United Service Organizations, and the Air Force Reserve.

In 2016, Rugged Maniac announced a partnership with the American Cancer Society, which includes a fundraising platform for the ACS on Crowdrise. Rugged Maniac participants who donate the most significant amounts of money are eligible for rewards and prizes.

Operation Enduring Warriors, an organization that supports disabled veterans, participated in Rugged Maniac Virginia 2015. They are a team of veterans or active-duty military personnel who wear training masks to restrict their airflow by approximately 25%, to symbolize the hardship that wounded or disabled veterans have to endure. They participate in obstacle course races, running races from 5K's to marathons, and cycling events alongside wounded veterans, to assist them over obstacles.

See also

References

External links

 Official website of Rugged Maniac
 Obstacles

Obstacle racing
Adventure racing
Outdoor recreation organizations
Outdoor recreation
5K runs
2010 establishments in Massachusetts
Recurring sporting events established in 2010
Multisports in the United States
Multisports in Canada